Dyckia tuberosa is a plant species in the genus Dyckia. This species is native to Brazil.

References

tuberosa
Flora of Brazil